Austronea is a genus of flowering plants in the family Asparagaceae, found in Namibia and South Africa. It is sister to Fusifilum.

Species
Currently accepted species include:

Austronea acarophylla (E.Brink & A.P.Dold) Mart.-Azorín, M.B.Crespo & A.P.Dold
Austronea barkerae (Oberm. ex J.C.Manning & Goldblatt) Mart.-Azorín, M.B.Crespo, M.Pinter & Wetschnig
Austronea chalumnensis (A.P.Dold & E.Brink) Mart.-Azorín, M.B.Crespo & A.P.Dold
Austronea ciliolata (J.C.Manning & J.M.J.Deacon) Mart.-Azorín, M.B.Crespo, M.Pinter & Wetschnig
Austronea densiflora Mart.-Azorín, M.B.Crespo & A.P.Dold
Austronea fimbrimarginata (Snijman) Mart.-Azorín, M.B.Crespo, M.Pinter & Wetschnig
Austronea grandiflora Mart.-Azorín, M.B.Crespo, M.Pinter & Wetschnig
Austronea hispidoplicata Mart.-Azorín, M.B.Crespo, M.Pinter & M.Á.Alonso
Austronea linearis Mart.-Azorín, M.B.Crespo & A.P.Dold
Austronea marginata (Thunb.) Mart.-Azorín, M.B.Crespo, M.Pinter & Wetschnig
Austronea olifanta Mart.-Azorín, M.B.Crespo, M.Pinter & M.Á.Alonso
Austronea papillosa Mart.-Azorín, M.B.Crespo, M.Pinter & M.Á.Alonso
Austronea patersoniae Mart.-Azorín, A.P.Dold & M.B.Crespo
Austronea pinguis Mart.-Azorín, M.B.Crespo, M.Pinter & M.Á.Alonso
Austronea pulchromarginata (J.C.Manning & Goldblatt) Mart.-Azorín, M.B.Crespo, M.Pinter & Wetschnig
Austronea trichophylla (Mart.-Azorín, A.P.Dold & M.B.Crespo) Mart.-Azorín, M.B.Crespo & A.P.Dold
Austronea vermiformis (J.C.Manning & Goldblatt) Mart.-Azorín, M.B.Crespo, M.Pinter & Wetschnig
Austronea virens (Schltr.) Mart.-Azorín, M.B.Crespo, M.Pinter & Wetschnig

References

Scilloideae
Asparagaceae genera